Somdet To (1788–1872; B.E. 2331–2415), known formally as Somdet Phra Buddhacarya (To Brahmaramsi), was one of the most famous Buddhist monks during Thailand's Rattanakosin period and continues to be the most widely known saintly monk in Thailand. He is widely revered in Thailand as a monk who is said that he possessed spiritual powers and his amulets are widely sought after. His images and statues are some of the most popular religious icons in Bangkok.

Biography
Somdet To was born in Phra Nakhon Si Ayutthaya Province, the illegitimate son of King Rama II. He studied the Buddhist scriptures of the Pāli Canon with several Buddhist masters. After becoming a well-known monk, he became the preceptor for Prince Mongkut, later King Rama IV, when Mongkut became a monk. During Rama IV's reign Somdet To was given the ceremonial name Somdet Phra Buddhacarya (To Brahmaramsi – Buddh[a]charya meaning teacher (acharya) of Buddhism) by the King and used to be one of his trusted advisers, having left a lot of teaching stories around him and the King.

He was noted for the skill of his preaching and his use of Thai poetry to reflect the beauty of Buddhism, and for making amulets called Somdej. The amulets were blessed by himself and other respected monks in Thailand. He also appears in many versions of the story of the ghost Mae Nak Phra Khanong, and he is said to be the one to finally subdue her. Somdet To also wrote the Jinapanjara, a protective magical incantation which is widely chanted and used by Thais.

Sources
 Legends of Somdet Toh, Ven. Thanissaro Bhikkhu,

References

1788 births
1872 deaths
Thai Theravada Buddhist monks
Thai people of Mon descent